Timm Sharp (born 1978) is an American actor and writer. He is known for his role as Marshall Nesbitt in the Fox sitcom Undeclared, Doug Von Stuessen in the Fox sitcom 'Til Death, and Jim in the Starz comedy Blunt Talk.

Early life and education 
Sharp is a native of Fargo, North Dakota, and throughout high school, he attended Trollwood Performing Arts School in North Fargo. Shortly after graduating high school, he moved to New York City to study acting at the American Academy of Dramatic Arts.

Career 
Sharp portrayed Marshall Nesbitt on the 2001 Fox sitcom, Undeclared, starring alongside Seth Rogen, Charlie Hunnam, Jay Baruchel, Carla Gallo, and Monica Keena. He had a recurring role on HBO's Six Feet Under, and the Fox series 'Til Death. Sharp then played Dougie in the HBO series Enlightened, created by Laura Dern and Mike White. Sharp replaced rapper-actor Mos Def in the comedy series shortly before filming began in 2010. Sharp was also a regular on the Starz cable network series Blunt Talk.

Sharp is very active in the improv community in Los Angeles and has performed with the Upright Citizens Brigade.

Filmography

Film

Television

References

External links

1978 births
Living people
American male film actors
American male screenwriters
American male television actors
Upright Citizens Brigade Theater performers
Screenwriters from North Dakota
Male actors from North Dakota
People from Fargo, North Dakota
21st-century American male actors
21st-century American comedians
21st-century American screenwriters
21st-century American male writers